Targa Adelaide is a tarmac-based rally event held on the state of South Australia, Australia, annually. The inaugural classic only event was 2011, but included modern vehicles from 2012. The event has an intermediate-length course design by Stuart Benson of approximately 260 competitive kilometres covered in five days over twenty nine closed road competitive rally stages.

Rally format 

The event is held east of Adelaide in the Adelaide hills area and race in Adelaide on the first night of competition.

 Leg 0 InterContinental Night Stage - Adelaide Showgrounds
 Leg 1 Upper Hermitage to Forreston, Kersbrook 
 Leg 2 Mount Lofty to Belair, via Heathfield  
 Leg 3 Castambul to Ironbank, via Stirling 
 Leg 4 Gorge Road to Torrens, ending in the gala finish on Norwood Parade

List of past winners

Modern Competition

Classic Competition

Other Targa competitions
 Targa Tasmania - Australia (TAS)
 Targa New Zealand - New Zealand
 Targa Florio - Italy
 Targa West - Australia (WA)
 Targa Newfoundland - Canada
 Targa Canada West - Canada

See also
Australian Targa Championship

References

www.targatasmania.com.au/Results/Past 
http://www.targatasmania.com.au/ 
2011 Targa Adelaide Results

External links
 Targa Adelaide website

Motorsport competitions in Australia
Rally competitions in Australia
Motorsport in South Australia